Marianne Samuelsson, born 9 December 1945 in Alingsås, is a Swedish politician (Green Party) and was the governor of Gotland County until having to resign four months early, on 4 August 2009. She was previously a member of the Riksdag for the Green Party from 1988 to 1991, and from 1994 to 2002. She was spokesperson for the Green Party, together with Birger Schlaug, from 1992 to 1999.

The background to resigning the position of governor was that someone on her staff secretly recorded a discussion in which Samuelsson stated that Gotland County should provide special consideration for a "distinguished" industry leader who wanted to build a house close to the sea. This recording was handed over to the local radio station, which made it public. A media storm ensued, and Samuelsson eventually had to resign, in acknowledgement of several mistakes she made in handling the scandal - notably, in stating that her only mistake was to have said what she did so as it could be recorded.

References

External links
Marianne Samuelsson at the Riksdag website 

1945 births
Living people
Governors of Gotland
Members of the Riksdag from the Green Party
Members of the Riksdag 1988–1991
Members of the Riksdag 1994–1998
Members of the Riksdag 1998–2002
Women members of the Riksdag
20th-century Swedish women politicians
20th-century Swedish politicians
21st-century Swedish women politicians
21st-century Swedish politicians